Lorenzo is an unincorporated community and census-designated place (CDP) in Will County, Illinois, United States. It is in the southwest part of the county, in the valley of the Kankakee River.

Lorenzo was first listed as a CDP prior to the 2020 census.

Demographics

References 

Census-designated places in Will County, Illinois
Census-designated places in Illinois
Unincorporated communities in Illinois
Unincorporated communities in Will County, Illinois